Doctor Dolittle's Garden (1927) is structurally the most disorganised of Hugh Lofting's Doctor Dolittle books. The first part would fit very well into Lofting's 1925 novel Doctor Dolittle's Zoo, which this book follows. The rest of the book forms a reasonably coherent narrative. From now on, Lofting would write the books in chronological order, and this book has to link the earlier, more light-hearted type of story with what was to come. The lack of structure is compensated for by Lofting's skill in subtly shifting the tone of his writing as the book progresses.

Plot introduction
Doctor Dolittle's assistant, Tommy Stubbins, reports on Professor Quetch, curator of the Dog Museum in the Home for Crossbred Dogs. Meanwhile, the doctor has learnt insect languages and hears ancient tales of a giant race of insects. Fascinated, the doctor plans a voyage to find them, but before he does so, one arrives in his garden.

External links
 
 Doctor Dolittle's Garden at Gutenberg Australia

1927 British novels
1927 children's books
1927 fantasy novels
British children's novels
Doctor Dolittle books
Frederick A. Stokes Company books